Amy Powers (born 1960) is a lyricist, songwriter and producer who writes songs for film, television, and theater.

Career

Early life
Powers graduated from Vassar College, and then attended Columbia University (M.B.A) and Harvard University law degree

Musical theater
Powers co-wrote the lyrics for the musical Cinderella: A Musical with composer Dan Levy for Riverside Shakespeare Company at Playhouse 91 in New York, which ran in December 1991 to March 1992. She wrote the lyrics and book for the stage musical Lizzie Borden with composer Christopher McGovern. The musical ran at Goodspeed Musicals Norma Terris Theatre (Chester, CT.) in November 2001. The Game, a stage musical for which Powers is the co-librettist/lyricist, was produced at Barrington Stage Company in August 2003.

She is the co/lyricist with Michael Korie for Doctor Zhivago, a musical based on the Russian novel Doctor Zhivago, by Boris Pasternak. The show was revised after its preview run at the La Jolla Playhouse, and premiered at the Lyric Theatre, Sydney in February 2011. The musical premiered on Broadway in April 2015.

Powers has been acknowledged by the producers of Sunset Boulevard for an unspecified role in the development of four songs from that show, including "With One Look," "The Greatest Star Of All," "Sunset Boulevard" and "As If We Never Said Goodbye".

Film and television

Powers' first song for film was the title track for the Oscar-Winning When We Were Kings (1996). She has also written songs for the films Sweet Home Alabama, Ella Enchanted and Aquamarine as well as television shows including Guiding Light, All My Children, Laguna Beach, Castle and America's Next Top Model. Powers' songs have been featured in Mattel's Barbie Movies  including Barbie & the Diamond Castle, Barbie as the Princess and the Pauper, and Disney Princess Enchanted Tales: Follow Your Dreams.

Nominations
Powers was nominated for an Outstanding Original Song Daytime Emmy in the Children's/Animated category for "Shine" in Barbie and the 12 Dancing Princesses in 2007,
 and an Annie Award for Best Music in an Animated Feature Production for her work in Disney Princess Enchanted Tales: Follow Your Dreams in 2007.

References

External links
Amy Powers at Internet Off-Broadway Database

Living people
American lyricists
Songwriters from California
Columbia Business School alumni
Harvard Law School alumni
Vassar College alumni
1961 births